Vladimir Aleksandrovich Trefilov (born 1949) is a Russian scholar of religious studies, philosophy of medicine, author and lecturer. He is also known as a poet, painter and yogi.

Biography
Born in Izhevsk, Udmurt Autonomous Soviet Socialist Republic, Trefilov studied History at Udmurt State University and Philosophy at Moscow State University. From 1975 he works for Izhevsk State Medical Academy. He obtained his Candidate of Sciences diploma and became in 1991 Head of the Department of Philosophy and Humanities at the Izhevsk State Medical Academy. He is author of over 50 scientific works. In 1992 he studied in United States.

Trefilov is a member of the Academic Council of the Kalashnikov Museum, in this museum he reads a cycle of public lectures Geopolitics and Military History.

Trefilov is author a book of sonnets Fireseed. (1989). In 2001 he became the head of "Udmurt Literature Union". Trefilov's pictures (in genre of "transrealism") have been displayed at 18 art exhibitions in Russia and there are in many private collections of Russia, England, and the United States. He has yoga teacher's international certificate.

Prophecy was fulfilled

Trefilov says he studied in 1992 in United States. Someway, in the beginning of December, surveying during walk on a vicinity of Manhattan, he gazed at "two enormous buildings" and suddenly has thought of fragility of these demonstrative displays of technical progress and is unexpected for itself has presented, as they flare and fall... He says, that, probably, behind it there was a sensation of alarm concerning vulnerability of a civilization, life, a universe. It considers, that, probably, the intuition has worked. He has returned to "native Izhevsk and has drawn four variants of it, as now began repeat often, apocalypse." Trefilov has finished the first picture in 1996, named its Angel of the Bottomless Pit. In 1997 there was the second, under the name The Star Wormwood. September 14, 2001 newspaper День wrote that "on September 12th, 2001 Vladimir Trefilov has urgently organized display of the pictures, considering that they most precisely correspond to the today's validity." After the terrorist attacks of 11 September the fact of Trefilov's prediction evoked a wide public response and was reported both in the press and on TV.

Publications and lectures
 

 Медитация и творчество. (2001)
 Философия йоги и философская поэзия Шри Ауробиндо Гхоша. (2003)
 Жизненный путь и философская поэзия Шри Ауробиндо Гхоша. (2005)
 Индийская синтетическая концепция сознания и проблема эволюции сакрального искусства. (2009)
 Проблема воздействия психических вирусов на социальные процессы. (2013) 
 Врач и его дело: избранные философские проблемы с позиции врача. (2014, in co-authorship)
 Лекция по интегральной йоге: структура сознания.
 Lectures about Integral yoga.
 Зерно огня: книга сонетов. (Прометей, 1989)
 Fireseed. A Book of Sonnets. (M.: Anch, 2005)
 A visit to Porfiry Ivanov. (Day and Night, May–June, 2011)
 Sri Aurobindo's Creative Career. Spiritual Poetry. (2012)

Notes

References

Sources

Who is who в России (in Russian). Zürich: Who is Who, Verlag für Personenenzyklopädien AG, 2010. Issue 4, pp. 2367–68.

External links
 Trefilov's Page on Facebook.
 Trefilov's pictures.
 Trefilov's poetry.
 Newspapers about Trefilov's prophecy.

1949 births
Living people
People from Izhevsk
20th-century Russian painters
Russian male painters
21st-century Russian poets
21st-century male writers
Russian male poets
20th-century Russian poets
Russian yogis
September 11 attacks
20th-century Russian philosophers
Yoga teachers